Ecem Taşın (born January 20, 1991) is a Turkish female visually impaired judoka (disability class B2) competing in the -48 kg division. She is a student of sport management at Trakya University in Edirne, Turkey.

Taşın captured a bronze medal at the 2013 IBSA European Judo Championships held in Eger, Hungary.
She took a bronze medal in the extra-lightweight (48 kg) event 
at the 2015 IBSA European Judo Championships in Odivelas, Portugal, and so obtained a qıota spot for the 2016 Summer Paralympics. At the 2016 Summer Paralympics, she won a bronze medal.

References

Living people
1991 births
Turkish female judoka
Paralympic judoka of Turkey
Visually impaired category Paralympic competitors
Judoka at the 2016 Summer Paralympics
Paralympic bronze medalists for Turkey
Medalists at the 2016 Summer Paralympics
Place of birth missing (living people)
Paralympic medalists in judo
Paralympic athletes with a vision impairment
Trakya University alumni
20th-century Turkish sportswomen
21st-century Turkish sportswomen
Turkish blind people